The discography of Roc Marciano, an American rapper, consists of nine studio albums, two promotional albums, five extended plays and two mixtapes.

Albums

Studio albums
 2010: Marcberg
 2012: Reloaded
 2013: Marci Beaucoup
 2017: Rosebudd's Revenge
 2018: RR2: The Bitter Dose
 2018: Behold a Dark Horse
 2018: Kaos (with DJ Muggs)
 2019: Marcielago
 2020: Mt. Marci
 2022: The Elephant Man’s Bones (with The Alchemist)

Instrumental albums
 2020: Pimpstrumentals

Mixtapes
 2013: The Pimpire Strikes Back

Roc Marciano-produced projects
 2018: Sabbath (with Therman Munsin)

 2020: Resonable Drought (with Stove God Cooks)
 2021: Delgado (with Flee Lord)
 2021: Ekphrasis (with Bronze Nazareth)
 2022: Blame Kansas (with T.F. & Mephux)

with The U.N.
 2004: Strength & Honor (The U.N. presents Rock Marciano) (Promotional mixtape released to promote the UN or U Out album)
 2004: UN or U Out (World Records/456 Entertainment)

EPs
 2010: The Marcberg EP
 2011: The Prophecy EP
 2011: Greneberg (with Gangrene (The Alchemist + Oh No) as Greneberg)
 2018: Warm Hennessy
 2019: The Prequel

Guest appearances

References

Discographies of American artists
Hip hop discographies